Angus MacLeod may refer to:

 Angus MacLeod (politician), farmer and political figure on Prince Edward Island
 Angus MacLeod (Royal Navy officer) (1847–1920)
 Angus Macleod (journalist), British journalist and editor

See also
 Angus McLeod (disambiguation)